Madosha Michael Tambwe (born 12 May 1997) is a South African rugby union player for Bordeaux Bègles. He usually plays as a winger.

Early life
Tambwe was born in Kinshasa, Zaire, a few days before the end of the First Congo War that resulted in the country's name being changed to the Democratic Republic of the Congo.

He grew up in Johannesburg in South Africa, where he attended and played first team rugby for Parktown Boys' High School.

Career

Golden Lions
In 2015, he was called up to the  squad for South Africa's premier high school rugby union tournament, the Under-18 Craven Week.

He was included in the  squad for the 2016 Under-19 Provincial Championship. Despite starting just four of his side's fourteen matches and playing off the bench on seven occasions, Tambwe scored 16 tries to finish as the competition's top try scorer. He scored his thirteenth try of the season in a 34–24 victory over trans-Jukskei rivals the s in the semi-final and rounded off his season with a hat-trick in the final against Western Province, as his side won 60–19 to be crowned champions of the competition.

Lions
Tambwe scored his first points in Round Five against the Kings with two tries. In the 2018 Super Rugby season Tambwe scored four tries in one game against the Stormers in Round Eight, getting a hat-trick within just thirteen minutes, the quickest hat-trick in Super Rugby history. On 13 July 2019, Tambwe scored four tries against the Griquas at Ellis Park in round one of the 2019 Currie Cup Premier Division.

Sharks
At the beginning of the 2020 Super Rugby season, Tambwe signed for the Cell C Sharks and has featured regularly since in both the original Super Rugby and the South African only version, Super Rugby Unlocked.

Bulls
On the 19th of February 2021, the Vodacom Blue Bulls announced that Tambwe had signed for the side from the Sharks. On the 22nd of June 2022, Tambwe had announced his departure from the Vodacom Blue Bulls after a year's tenure.

Bordeaux Bègles
On 26 July 2022, Bordeaux Bègles announced that Tambwe would join the club for the upcoming season. He made his Top 14 debut on 4 September 2022 against Toulouse, scoring two tries in the first half of the match.

Honours

Bulls
 Currie Cup: 2021
 Pro14 Rainbow Cup runner-up 2021
 United Rugby Championship runner-up: 2021-22

References

South African rugby union players
Democratic Republic of the Congo rugby union players
Living people
1997 births
Sportspeople from Kinshasa
Rugby union wings
Lions (United Rugby Championship) players
Democratic Republic of the Congo emigrants to South Africa
Alumni of Parktown Boys' High School
Golden Lions players
Sharks (rugby union) players
Sharks (Currie Cup) players
Bulls (rugby union) players
Blue Bulls players
Union Bordeaux Bègles players